The city of Mansfield, Ohio, was home to minor league baseball teams, known by various nicknames, which played periodically between 1887 and 1912, and between 1935 and 1941.

History

Late 19th century
The team first began play in the Ohio State League in 1887 as simply Mansfield. The following season, the club moved to the Tri-State League until 1890. After a three-year hiatus, Mansfield once again fielded a new team, the Mansfield Electricians and played the 1893 season in the short-lived Ohio–Michigan League. No team was then fielded until 1897, when the city fielded the Mansfield Haymakers in the Interstate League.

Early 20th century
In 1906, the city was represented in then Ohio–Pennsylvania League with the Mansfield Giants. The club changed its name to the Mansfield Pioneers in 1907 until 1909. The team was once again renamed the Mansfield Reformers in 1910 and the Mansfield Brownies in 1911. In 1912 the club moved back to the Ohio State League for their final season of this era.

Pre-World War II
In 1935, the Mansfield Tigers were champions of the Ohio State League. The Tigers also competed briefly in 1936, disbanding on May 25. In 1937, competing as the Mansfield Red Sox, the team again were Ohio State League champions. The team's final seasons were 1939 as the Mansfield Indians, 1940 as the Mansfield Braves, and 1941 as the Braves.

Year-by-year record

Source:

References

Mansfield, Ohio
Baseball teams established in 1887
Baseball teams disestablished in 1941
1887 establishments in Ohio
1941 disestablishments in Ohio
Defunct minor league baseball teams
Ohio State League teams
Defunct Interstate League teams
Defunct baseball teams in Ohio
Defunct Tri-State League teams
Ohio-Pennsylvania League teams